Bad Vegan and the Teleportation Machine is a 2016 American romantic comedy thriller independent film directed and written by Antón Goenechea. It stars Brianne Berkson, Andy Bean, Adam Mucci, Adam Scarimbolo, and Frank Pando. It was produced by Berkson and was distributed by Everlasting Films. The film was screened in February and released in October 2016 at the Woodstock Film Festival.

Cast

 Andy Bean as Spike
 Brianne Berkson as Lily
 Adam Mucci as Paul
 Adam Scarimbolo as Harrison
 Frank Pando as Luther
 Jay Seals as Tom
 Kara Jackson as Marcia
 Tamara Tunie as Josephine Bodder
 Steve Hytner as Roger Bodder
 Rosalyn Coleman as Dr. Leffie

Production
Filming took place in New York City, with a set partially built on location.

References

External links
 
 

2016 films
2016 romantic comedy films
American romantic comedy films
Films shot in New York City
American independent films
2010s romantic thriller films
2016 independent films
2010s English-language films
2010s American films